Werner Weber may refer to:
Werner Weber (canoeist) (b. 1939), Swiss athlete in the 1960 Olympics
Werner Weber (mathematician) (1906–1975), German student of Emmy Noether, wartime cryptographer, and Nazi
Werner Weber (artist), mural painter of Deutz Abbey, near Cologne in Germany
Werner Weber (cyclist) (1942–2001), Swiss winner of the 1963 Stausee-Rundfahrt Klingnau
Werner Weber (journalist) (1919–2005), Swiss journalist and literary scholar, 1967 winner of the Johann-Heinrich-Merck-Preis
Werner Weber (Kriegsmarine) (died 1944), commander of German submarine U-845
Werner Weber (politician), mayor of Naurath (Wald), a municipality in Germany